The 2021–22 season was the Chittagong Abahani's 42nd season since its establishment in 1980 and their 12th season in the Bangladesh Premier League. This also remarked their 8th consecutive season in the top flight after getting promoted in 2014. In addition to domestic league, Ctg Abahani participated on this season's edition of Federation Cup and Independence Cup. The season covered the period from October 2021 to August 2022.

One of the club's new overseas signings, Nigerian striker Peter Ebimobowei scored 22 goals across all the competitions including 20 goals in 2021–22 BPL, making him the first player of the club to score 20 goals in a single Premier League season. Among the other overseas signings of this season, Omid Popalzay was the first Afghan and William Twala was the first South African to represent the club. This was the last season under head coach Maruful Haque.

Players

Transfers

In

Out

Pre-season and friendlies

Competitions

Overview

Independence Cup

Group stage

The draw for the group stage was held on 23 November 2021.

</onlyinclude>

Federation Cup

Group stage
The draw for the group stage was held on 23 December 2021.

Knockout phase

Bangladesh Premier League

League table

Results summary

Results by round

Matches

Statistics

Squad statistics

† Player left Ctg Abahani during the season.

Goalscorers

Assists

Reference

Chittagong
Bangladeshi football club records and statistics
2021 in Bangladeshi football
2022 in Bangladeshi football